Ram Sampath (born 25 July 1977) is an Indian composer, music producer and musician, who started his career composing advertising jingles for Mumbai-based advertising industry, subsequently he started composing for pop albums like Tanha Dil (2000) by Shaan, before composing for films like Khakee, Delhi Belly (2011), Talaash (2012), Raees etc.

He has composed music for advertising jingles for brands like Airtel, Docomo, Thums Up, Pepsi and the Times of India.

Early life and background
Born to a Tamilian father and Kannadiga mother, Sampath grew up in Chembur, Mumbai where he did his schooling from OLPS High School. Both his parents were musically inclined, while his grandfather TV Ramanujam, was one of the founder of Shanmukhananda Hall, a cultural centre in Sion, Mumbai, established in 1952. Thus his ancestral house, was frequented by leading musicians and singers of Carnatic music. Later on, he too learnt Carnatic music for eight years. After his schooling he studied commerce at Podar College, Mumbai, where he played keyboard in a rock band.

Career

Non-film music

Over the years, he has composed advertising jingles for brands like Airtel, Docomo, Thums Up, Pepsi and the Times of India, for which he composed the theme song for the "I Lead India" campaign in 2013.

In 2008, he collaborated with the Australian rock band INXS to record Indian version of their songs, God's Top Ten, Devil's Party, and Afterglow. Also in 2008, the Bombay High Court ruled that two songs from the film, Krazzy 4, including the title track "Krazzy4" and "Break-free" plagiarised the "hook-phrase" from an advertisement previously composed by Sampath for Sony Ericsson. The court ordered a stay on film's release with the two songs. Subsequently, the case was settled out-of-court after producers paid Sampath , and film was released along with the songs. However the judgment was seen by "landmark decision" by legal commentators, as it set a new precedent in the Indian film industry, often plagued with plagiarism. In 2012, he composed the highly popular title track "Tera Rang Aisa" of the debut talkshow Satyamev Jayate hosted by Aamir Khan, it had lyrics by Prasoon Joshi.

He was also part of the 2013 season of the popular television music series Coke Studio.

Film music
Sampath got his first break as a film score composer with Let's Talk (2002) directed by Ram Madhvani. Thereafter, he composed for several films like Khakee (2004) and Family (2006) by Rajkumar Santoshi, besides Jumbo (2008), Aagey Se Right (2009) and Luv Ka The End (2011). However, he first received popular acclaim with Delhi Belly (2011) produced by Aamir Khan. Most notably hit track "Bhaag DK Bose Aandhi Aayi" with -rock beat, became an internet sensation ahead of the release of the film. Later he received a Filmfare Award nomination for the film.  His next film, Talaash (2012) was a joint production between Farhan Akhtar's Excel Entertainment and Aamir Khan Productions also starring Aamir Khan as the lead. The music received positive reviews, including Indiaglitz, which noted, "Once again Ram Sampath has an unmatched compilation of tracks here. Along with Javed Akhtar's fantastic lyrics they have created a masterpiece here." Thereafter, Akhtar signed him again for his next production, Fukrey, directed by Mrigdeep Singh Lamba. Fukrey was a sleeper hit and opened to good music reviews, especially for the song "Ambarsariya", an adaptation of a traditional Punjabi folk song, performed by Sona Mohapatra, his wife and regular collaborator.

Television
In 2009, he appeared as a judge of singing reality series, MTV Rock On (Season 1) on MTV India, along with singer Kailash Kher and MTV VJ Nikhil Chinapa.

Personal life
Ram Sampath is married to Sona Mohapatra, a singer, who is his frequent collaborator and business partner in their music production house OmGrown Music. The couple resides in Mumbai. The couple met in 2002, while she was still working as a brand manager with Marico. They were introduced by director Ram Madhvani, with whom Sampath was working for Let's Talk (2002); they married in 2005.

Discography

Films

Albums

Television

Awards and nominations

References

External links
 Official Website of Ram Sampath
 
 Ram Sampath at Last.fm

1977 births
Living people
Indian film score composers
Indian male playback singers
Indian record producers
Indian male singer-songwriters
Indian singer-songwriters
Singers from Mumbai
Tamil musicians
University of Mumbai alumni
Television composers
Jingle composers
Indian male film score composers